Joseph Preston (born June 14, 1955) is a Canadian politician, currently the mayor of St. Thomas, Ontario. He was previously a Member of Parliament, representing Elgin—Middlesex—London riding from 2004 to 2015 as a member of a Conservative Party of Canada.

He defeated Liberal incumbent Gar Knutson in the 2004 federal election. He was re-elected in the 2006, 2008 and 2011 federal elections. He did not run again in 2015 and retired from parliament.

On July 10, 2018, Preston announced that he was running for mayor of St. Thomas in the 2018 Ontario municipal election, which he won.

Prior to being an MP, he was an entrepreneur in St. Thomas, and was active in local politics.

Electoral record

References

External links 

1955 births
Canadian restaurateurs
Conservative Party of Canada MPs
Members of the House of Commons of Canada from Ontario
People from Chatham-Kent
Mayors of St. Thomas, Ontario
Living people
21st-century Canadian politicians